Thomas Ainsworth (1795–1841) was an Englishman and the founding father of Nijverdal.

Thomas Ainsworth may also refer to:

Sir Thomas Ainsworth, 2nd Baronet of the Ainsworth baronets (1886–1971)
Sir Thomas Ainsworth, 4th Baronet of the Ainsworth baronets (1926–1999)